Terron Brooks is an American singer, songwriter, and actor. He is best known for his portrayal of R&B/pop singer Eddie Kendricks in the 1998 NBC miniseries The Temptations.

Biography
Born on October 13, 1974 and raised in Southern California, Brooks has been singing since the age of six.

He has sung with many artists including Stephanie Mills, Smokey Robinson and Michael Jackson, and has performed in the US and Europe. He had been a member of the doo-wop group The Alley Cats.  He is also Broadway actor who has been seen as "Simba" in Disney's The Lion King and "Seaweed" in Hairspray. Terron has been featured on numerous film and TV soundtrack albums including Tears from the Sun, the Adventures of Brer Rabbit and ABC's Gepetto.

In 2006, Brooks inked a deal with GoDigital Records, a subsidiary of the GoDigital Media Group for exclusive worldwide digital distribution.

Musical career
In the middle of 2006 Brooks had an interview on KABC radio station (which is posted on his Myspace) and his single "Down" from his first album, Prelude, was played for the first time.

Terron has produced three albums: Prelude, Alive and Overture. He is currently working on his fourth album, which will be a full-length studio album, unlike the others.

Three songs from the upcoming anticipated studio album have been posted on Brooks' Myspace page, including: "I Will Wait For You There," "Champion," and "Love Out Loud."

It was posted on his Myspace that he was recording a Christmas album, and three songs were posted there: "Winter Wonderland," 'Oh Holy Night," and "Love At Christmas," which is the title of the CD. In June 2010 Brooks sang back-up during Phil Collins' tour promoting his Going Back album.

The Christmas album, released on November 14, is now available at godigitalrecords.com (link below) and at his concerts. Terron is still working hard on his next album, the date it will be released is unknown.

Discography
 Studio Albums
 2006: Prelude
 2007: Overture
 2008: Love at Christmas
 2012: Contagious
 Live Albums
 2007: Alive

Living people
African-American male  singer-songwriters
American male television actors
American male film actors
1974 births
Male actors from California
21st-century African-American male singers
20th-century African-American male singers